The Military Committee of National Restoration (CMRN) was the ruling junta of Guinea which seized power in a coup d'état on 3 April 1984, following the death of President Ahmed Sékou Touré on 26 March. It was composed of 18 members who represented the three tribes of the country, including Col. Lansana Conté, President from 1984 to 2008, Kerfalla Camara, Facinet Touré and Diarra Traoré, Prime Minister in 1984, who was executed following a failed coup attempt in 1985. It was dissolved on 16 January 1991 and replaced by the Transitional National Recovery Committee (CTRN), which was chaired and composed on equal basis by civilians and military.

See also 

 Politics of Guinea

References 

1984 establishments in Guinea
1991 disestablishments in Guinea
Politics of Guinea
Political organisations based in Guinea
Guinea